Brucella cytisi is a non-rhizobial root-nodulating bacterium. It nodulates Cytisus scoparius, hence its name. Strain ESC1T (=LMG 22713T=CECT 7172T) is the type strain.

References

Further reading

External links 

LPSN
Type strain of Ochrobactrum cytisi at BacDive -  the Bacterial Diversity Metadatabase

Hyphomicrobiales
Bacteria described in 2007